Insurance King Agency, Inc., dba Insurance King, is an Illinois-based insurance agency.

The agency is headquartered in Rockford, Illinois and is currently owned by Daniel Block. The agency, then called Nyman Advisors, Inc., was created in 2000 by co-founders Scot Nyman and Dan Block, and was renamed to Insurance King in 2001. The agency handles auto and motorcycle insurance, along with SR-22s and roadside assistance.

History 
In 2000, Block would become an insurance agent for a competing agency, when he learned that other insurance carriers had lower insurance rates. In the same year, Block would run into Scot Nyman, who had recently started his own agency. While having lunch one day with Nyman, Block would eventually decide to leave his employer work for Nyman's agency, Nyman Advisors, Inc.

In 2001, Nyman Advisors would undergo a name change to become Insurance King, after a salesman complimented the agency to Block and called Block "The Insurance King". The name stuck with Block, and he would eventually change the name of the agency to "Insurance King".

In March 2003, Block would buy the agency from Nyman, making Block the sole owner of Insurance King.

In 2003, Block would testify as a witness for SR-22 insurance, as the state of Illinois was looking to implement a mandatory insurance law within the state. Block would help offer ideas to help Illinois prevent fraudulent SR-22 insurance filings and help to transition the filing process electronically.

In 2012, Block would create an expansion project for the agency, which included expanding offering coverage to other, nearby states to Illinois. The plan was eventually implemented in 2013. The agency would report doubling the size of the agency three years in a row.

In February 2013, Insurance King would sign Lighthouse Casualty Company, a carrier focused on teen and mid-twenties drivers, as one of their insurance carriers.

In 2018, the agency would open up their first location outside of Rockford, a physical location in Peoria, Illinois. To help promote the opening, Block would hire actor Dustin Diamond to make commercials promoting the new agency. Until his death, Diamond would make commercials with the agency to promote "minimum coverage" with numerous advertising campaigns being made, including parodies to Diamond's character from Saved by the Bell, Screech.

In 2020, a series of Insurance King commercials parodying Tiger King went viral. The commercials featured actor Todd Bridges (playing Joe Exotic) and Tiger King stars Saff Saffery and John Reinke. The commercials featured Tiger King references, Joe Exotic quotes, and insults at Carole Baskin.

Locations 
Insurance King currently has six physical locations around the state of Illinois, with two more being built and planning to open sometime in 2022.

Lawsuit 
In 2020, Insurance King would file a lawsuit against Rancho Cucamonga, California-based company Just Auto Insurance, Inc. for "trademark infringement, unfair competition and false designation of origin under the Lanham Act". The agency claimed that Just Auto Insurance had been using a similar slogan and logo of Insurance King, even after Insurance King told Just Auto Insurance to cease connections with their advertising. On June 14, 2021, it was decided that Just Auto Insurance had been trademark infringing on Insurance King and were made to stop using the slogan and anything "confusingly similar" to the cartoon lion from Insurance King.

NASCAR sponsorship 

In 2019, NASCAR driver Josh Bilicki would send a Facebook message to the agency, asking them if they could sponsor Bilicki for the upcoming Chicagoland Speedway weekend. The agency would agree, and Insurance King would sponsor Bilicki for the weekend, becoming the first ever insurance agency to ever sponsor a NASCAR car. Since then, the agency has only grown its sponsorship of Bilicki, with numerous special schemes being made. The agency has also made several variations of "hero cards" of Bilicki.

References

External links 
 Insurance King

American companies established in 2001
Financial services companies established in 2001
Insurance companies of the United States
Companies based in Rockford, Illinois